The National Technological University – Santa Fe Regional Faculty (Spanish: Universidad Tecnológica Nacional - Facultad Regional Santa Fe (UTN-FRSF)).

History 
This college is one of the 29 regional faculties of Argentina's National Technological University. The faculty was founded in 1953 and its first classes were at the National University of the Littoral because it didn't have its own building. The main building was built in 1978, next to the Setúbal lake. The faculty has its own stadium: Estadio U.T.N. Santa Fe, it was opened on November 10, 1982. It was specially built for the 1982 Southern Cross Games and has also hosted the 1990 FIBA World Championship, several FIVB Volleyball World League matches and the 2017 FIVB Volleyball Girls' U18 World Championship. The stadium has capacity for 3.500 and a surface of 17.500 m2.

Nowadays the faculty has approximately 3.000 students, 430 teachers, 144 researchers and 1000 non-teaching staff.

Higher Education
 Technicatures:
 Superior Technicature in Information Technology
 Superior Technicature in Mecatronics

Degrees

Civil engineering
Electrical engineering
Mechanical engineering
Industrial engineering
Information systems engineering

Postgraduate Degrees
 Doctorates:
 Engineering Doctorate - Information Systems Engineering Mention
 Engineering Doctorate - Industrial Engineering Mention
 Magisters:
 Magister in Environmental Engineering
 Magister in Information Systems Engineering
 Magister in Quality Engineering
 Specializations:
 Specialization in Environmental Engineering
 Specialization in Information Systems Engineering
 Specialization in Quality Engineering
 Specialization in Work Hygiene and Safety

Sources 
  Official website

Rosario
Engineering universities and colleges in Argentina
Technical universities and colleges in Argentina